Thin Ice is a 1956 novel by the British writer Compton Mackenzie. It tells the career of a homosexual politician seen through the eyes of his lifelong, heterosexual friend.

References

Bibliography
 David Joseph Dooley. Compton Mackenzie. Twayne Publishers, 1974.

1956 British novels
Novels by Compton Mackenzie
Novels set in London
Novels set in Morocco
1950s LGBT novels
British LGBT novels
Chatto & Windus books